In the 2002 season, Djurgårdens IF competed in the Allsvenskan, the Svenska Cupen, and the UEFA Cup.

Squad information

Squad

Player statistics
Appearances for competitive matches only

|}

Topscorers

Total

Allsvenskan

Svenska Cupen

UEFA Cup

Competitions

Overall

Allsvenskan

League table

Matches

Svenska Cupen

UEFA Cup

|}

Friendlies

References

Djurgarden
Djurgårdens IF Fotboll seasons
Swedish football championship-winning seasons